NAD-dependent deacetylase sirtuin 2 is an enzyme that in humans is encoded by the SIRT2 gene. SIRT2 is an NAD+ (nicotinamide adenine dinucleotide)-dependent deacetylase. Studies of this protein have often been divergent, highlighting the dependence of pleiotropic effects of SIRT2 on cellular context. The natural polyphenol resveratrol is known to exert opposite actions on neural cells according to their normal or cancerous status. Similar to other sirtuin family members, SIRT2 displays a ubiquitous distribution. SIRT2 is expressed in a wide range of tissues and organs and has been detected particularly in metabolically relevant tissues, including the brain, muscle, liver, testes, pancreas, kidney, and adipose tissue of mice. Of note, SIRT2 expression is much higher in the brain than all other organs studied, particularly in the cortex, striatum, hippocampus, and spinal cord.

Function 

Studies suggest that the human sirtuins may function as intracellular regulatory proteins with mono-ADP-ribosyltransferase activity. Cytosolic functions of SIRT2 include the regulation of microtubule acetylation, control of myelination in the central and peripheral nervous system and gluconeogenesis. There is growing evidence for additional functions of SIRT2 in the nucleus. During the G2/M transition, nuclear SIRT2 is responsible for global deacetylation of H4K16, facilitating H4K20 methylation and subsequent chromatin compaction. In response to DNA damage, SIRT2 was also found to deacetylate H3K56 in vivo. Finally, SIRT2 negatively regulates the acetyltransferase activity of the transcriptional co-activator p300 via deacetylation of an automodification loop within its catalytic domain.

Structure

Gene 

Human SIRT2 gene has 18 exons resides on chromosome 19 at q13. For SIRT2, four different human splice variants are deposited in the GenBank sequence database.

Protein 

SIRT2 gene encodes a member of the sirtuin family of proteins, homologs to the yeast Sir2 protein. Members of the sirtuin family are characterized by a sirtuin core domain and grouped into four classes.  The protein encoded by this gene is included in class I of the sirtuin family. Several transcript variants are resulted from alternative splicing of this gene. Only transcript variants 1 and 2 have confirmed protein products of physiological relevance. A leucine-rich nuclear export signal (NES) within the N-terminal region of these two isoforms is identified. Since deletion of the NES led to nucleocytoplasmic distribution, it is suggested to mediate their cytosolic localization.

Selective ligands

Inhibitors 
 Benzamide compound # 64
 (S)-2-Pentyl-6-chloro,8-bromo-chroman-4-one: IC50 of 1.5 μM, highly selective over SIRT2 and SIRT3
 3′-Phenethyloxy-2-anilinobenzamide (33i): IC50 of 0.57 μM

Model organisms 

The functions of human sirtuins have not yet been determined; however, model organisms have been used in the study of SIRT2 function. Yeast sirtuin proteins are known to regulate epigenetic gene silencing and suppress recombination of rDNA.

A conditional knockout mouse line, called Sirt2tm1a(EUCOMM)Wtsi was generated as part of the International Knockout Mouse Consortium program — a high-throughput mutagenesis project to generate and distribute animal models of disease to interested scientists — at the Wellcome Trust Sanger Institute. Male and female animals underwent a standardized phenotypic screen to determine the effects of deletion.
Twenty five tests were carried out on homozygous mutant adult mice, however no significant abnormalities were observed.

Animal studies

Metabolic actions 

SIRT2 suppresses inflammatory responses in mice through p65 deacetylation and inhibition of NF-κB activity. SIRT2 is responsible for the deacetylation and activation of G6PD, stimulating pentose phosphate pathway to supply cytosolic NADPH to counteract oxidative damage and protect mouse erythrocytes.

Neurodegeneration 

Several studies in cell and invertebrate models of Parkinson's disease (PD) and Huntington's disease (HD) suggested potential neuroprotective effects of SIRT2 inhibition, in striking contrast with other sirtuin family members.  In addition, recent evidence shows that inhibition of SIRT2 protects against MPTP-induced neuronal loss in vivo.

Clinical significance

Metabolic actions

Several SIRT2 deacetylation targets play important roles in metabolic homeostasis. SIRT2 inhibits adipogenesis by deacetylating FOXO1 and thus may protect against insulin resistance. SIRT2 sensitizes cells to the action of insulin by physically interacting with and activating Akt and downstream targets. SIRT2 mediates mitochondrial biogenesis by deacetylating PGC-1α, upregulates antioxidant enzyme expression by deacetylating FOXO3a, and thereby reduces ROS levels.

Cell cycle regulation

Although preferentially cytosolic, SIRT2 transiently shuttles to the nucleus during the G2/M transition of the cell cycle, where it has a strong preference for histone H4 lysine 16 (H4K16ac), thereby regulating chromosomal condensation during mitosis. During the cell cycle, SIRT2 associates with several mitotic structures including the centrosome, mitotic spindle, and midbody, presumably to ensure normal cell division. Finally, cells with SIRT2 overexpression exhibit marked prolongation of the cell cycle.

Tumorigenesis 

Mounting evidence implies a role for SIRT2 in tumorigenesis. SIRT2 may suppress or promote tumor growth in a context-dependent manner. SIRT2 has been proposed to act as a tumor suppressor by preventing chromosomal instability during mitosis. SIRT2-specific inhibitors exhibits broad anticancer activity.

Interactions 

SIRT2 has been shown to interact with:
 α-tubulin,
 TUG,
 β-catenin,
 PGAM2,
 TIAM1,
 ApoE4,
 p53,
 PEPCK,
 FOXO1,
 p300,
 14-3-3 protein,
 G6PD, and
 CBP.

References

Further reading

External links 
 

Genes mutated in mice